Acoma Township is a township in McLeod County, Minnesota, United States. The population was 1,185 at the 2000 census.

Acoma Township was named after the Acoma Pueblo in New Mexico.

Geography

The town hall address is 23486 230th St, Hutchinson, MN 55350 and is also the polling place for that area. The official website is https://www.acomatownship.com/

Demographics
As of the census of 2000, there were 1,185 people, 387 households, and 332 families residing in the township. There were 397 housing units at an average density of 12.6/sq mi (4.9/km). The racial makeup of the township was 99.07% White, 0.08% African American, 0.17% Native American, 0.17% Asian, 0.17% from other races, and 0.34% from two or more races. Hispanic or Latino of any race were 0.25% of the population.

There were 387 households, out of which 45.7% had children under the age of 18 living with them, 79.1% were married couples living together, 3.4% had a female householder with no husband present, and 14.2% were non-families. 11.6% of all households were made up of individuals, and 3.9% had someone living alone who was 65 years of age or older.  The average household size was 3.06 and the average family size was 3.33.

In the township the population was spread out, with 32.2% under the age of 18, 5.5% from 18 to 24, 28.9% from 25 to 44, 25.8% from 45 to 64, and 7.6% who were 65 years of age or older.  The median age was 38 years. For every 100 females, there were 107.2 males.  For every 100 females age 18 and over, there were 112.7 males.

The median income for a household in the township was $67,292, and the median income for a family was $71,458. Males had a median income of $41,563 versus $31,667 for females. The per capita income for the township was $23,302.  About 2.4% of families and 4.1% of the population were below the poverty line, including 5.0% of those under age 18 and 5.0% of those age 65 or over.

References

Townships in McLeod County, Minnesota
Townships in Minnesota